The Chöpfenberg (1,896 m) is a mountain of the Schwyzer Alps, located on the border between the Swiss cantons of Schwyz and Glarus. It lies on the range north of the Mutteristock, between the valleys of the Wägitalersee and the Linth.

References

External links
Chöpfenberg on Hikr

Mountains of the Alps
Mountains of Switzerland
Mountains of the canton of Schwyz
Mountains of the canton of Glarus
Glarus–Schwyz border
One-thousanders of Switzerland